Anders Dahl Simonsen (born 9 March 1983) is a Danish football player currently playing for Danish 2nd Division East side B.93. He plays as a midfielder.

External links
Anders Simonsen on B93 (Danish)

1983 births
Living people
Danish men's footballers
Boldklubben af 1893 players

Association football midfielders